is a Japanese golfer.

Career
Hoshino was born in Sendai, Miyagi Prefecture. He has won three times on the Japan Golf Tour. He has featured in the top 100 of the Official World Golf Ranking.

Professional wins (3)

Japan Golf Tour wins (3)

Japan Golf Tour playoff record (0–1)

Results in major championships

CUT = missed the half-way cut
Note: Hoshino only played in The Open Championship.

Results in World Golf Championships

"T" = Tied

Team appearances
Amateur
Eisenhower Trophy (representing Japan): 1996, 1998
Bonallack Trophy (representing Asia/Pacific): 1998

References

External links

Japanese male golfers
Japan Golf Tour golfers
Asian Games medalists in golf
Asian Games gold medalists for Japan
Asian Games bronze medalists for Japan
Golfers at the 1998 Asian Games
Medalists at the 1998 Asian Games
Sportspeople from Sendai
1977 births
Living people